Alpine skiing  at the 2013 European Youth Olympic Winter Festival was held at the Sub Teleferic slope in Poiana Brașov, Romania from 18 to 22 February 2013.

Results

Medal table

Men's events

Ladies' events

Mixed events

References

External links
Results
Poiana Brașov at EYOWF 2013 | Photo Gallery
Sub Teleferic at YouTube
EYOWF 2013 - Presentation Video at YouTube
EYOWF 2013 - Facilities Presentation at YouTube

2013 in alpine skiing
2013 European Youth Olympic Winter Festival events
2013